Sharon Janny den Adel (born 12 July 1974) is a Dutch singer who is the lead vocalist and one of the main songwriters of the symphonic metal band Within Temptation. She has been a performing musician since the age of 14, and is a founding member of Within Temptation, along with Robert Westerholt, in 1996. She was also elected to be the Dutch chairperson of the jury for the Eurovision Song Contest 2018.

Personal life 
Sharon Janny den Adel was born on 12 July 1974 in Waddinxveen. She travelled extensively in her youth, living in at least ten different countries, including Indonesia, where she lived between ages one and six. According to den Adel, some movements that she makes during her concerts are inspired by the Balinese dancers she had seen during that time. After returning from Suriname to the Netherlands, she was bullied by classmates because of her different clothing style, hairstyle, and darkened skin. From the age of fourteen, she performed with various bands, including a blues rock band called Kashiro. As their partnership grew, in 1996 they came to form a band called The Portal, though the name was changed to Within Temptation before their debut recording. She has a bachelor's degree in fashion design.

Den Adel and long-term partner Robert Westerholt have three children together, and they currently live near Hilversum. Den Adel was pregnant with their first child during The Silent Force tour, and she gave birth in December 2005.

On 22 February 2009, Den Adel announced that she was pregnant with her second child. The band's official website announced their son's birth in June 2009.

On 26 November 2010, Den Adel announced that she was expecting her third child; the band's 2011 tour dates were rescheduled from spring until autumn. The birth of her third son was announced in March 2011.

Career

Training and vocal profile 
Sharon never formally studied singing and stated in a 2006 interview that she had sung a short while in a choir and was mostly self-taught. She used to practice alone three or four hours per day. Her vocal range is a mezzo-soprano.

Within Temptation 

Together with her partner, Robert Westerholt, den Adel formed Within Temptation (initially called The Portal, though the name was changed before their first recording) in 1996. She has defined their work as epic and cinematic. Her vocals play a major role in the band's sound, despite having never received formal vocal training.

Before Within Temptation became famous, she worked for a fashion company, leaving after the band found success with their hit single "Ice Queen". She utilizes her fashion expertise by designing her stage costumes and the band's merchandise. About.com described den Adel as a "versatile and skilled singer who is equally adept at singing powerfully with a full orchestra and choir as she is at singing quietly and emotionally with just a piano." When asked if she prefers to sing in Dutch or English, den Adel said that she favors the latter because "Dutch just doesn't fit to our music style. It is also not the nicest language to sing in. Italian or Spanish would then be better options."

The band were invited several times to compete at the Eurovision Song Contest as the Dutch representatives, but they have declined every time since they find it not the best place for a metal band to present themselves. In 2018, den Adel was then selected as a juror for that year's edition.

My Indigo 

On 9 November 2017, den Adel announced on the Dutch TV-show RTL Late Night, that on the following day 10 November 2017, the first single for her solo project My Indigo, also entitled "My Indigo", would be released. According to den Adel, the project was originally not intended to be released to the general public as it was for her a form to deal with personal problems, and also due to a writer's block for composing for Within Temptation. After two years composing for herself and with regained inspiration to write for Within Temptation, den Adel decided to share the project publicly as a separate project named "My Indigo". The self titled first album was released on 20 April 2018.

Collaborations with other artists 

Den Adel has performed on-stage and in the studio with several notable artists from varied musical genres, including Tarja Turunen, Armin van Buuren, After Forever, De Heideroosjes, Oomph!, Delain, Agua de Annique, Anneke van Giersbergen and Evanescence. Before forming Within Temptation, den Adel worked together with Voyage, formed by some of the future Within Temptation members, on the track "Frozen" (not to be confused with the Within Temptation song of the same title).

The vocalist took part in several rock and metal opera projects, singing the part of Anna Held in two of Tobias Sammet's Avantasia releases, The Metal Opera and The Metal Opera Part II, later also singing the part of the "Muse" in the 2016 album Ghostlights. She also took the part of the "Indian" on Ayreon's rock opera Into the Electric Castle. Den Adel then collaborated on two of Timo Tolkki's projects, being a guest vocalist on Timo Tolkki's Avalon track "Shine", for the work The Land of New Hope, and was featured in his solo project track "Are You the One?".

Within the symphonic metal scene, den Adel collaborated with After Forever on the track "Beyond Me", released on the album Prison of Desire, performing the song live with the band at selected concerts. She was part of a duet with Marko Hietala on the track "No Compliance" for Delain's album Lucidity, also joining the band on selected live performances of the song. Den Adel was one of the guest vocalists invited for Tarja Turunen's rendition of Feliz Navidad, which featured an ensemble of names from the heavy metal scene and was released as a benefit single.

Also venturing on other musical genres, den Adel co-wrote and recorded the vocals for the track "In and Out of Love" on Armin van Buuren's 2008 trance album Imagine, which earned them awards for "Best Progressive House/Trance Track" and "Best video" on the International Dance Music Awards. They performed a special version of the song alongside the Metropole Orchestra at the 2010 edition of the Golden Harp gala ceremony, where van Buuren was awarded for his musical work. At the 2009 edition of the Night of the Proms, den Adel made a guest appearance during John Miles' performance of "Stairway to Heaven". At the end of 2012, den Adel made an appearance on a charity campaign made by a Belgian radio station to raise money for children singing the chorus of the song het Meneer Konijn lied among other Belgian celebrities. The song later topped the Belgian charts. In 2014, den Adel collaborated with Dutch rapper Ali B on the track "Hier".

In 2020, Sharon was asked by American rock band Evanescence to collaborate with them for their single "Use My Voice". Along with lead singer Amy Lee, other musicians joined in on the song such as rock vocalists Lzzy Hale, Taylor Momsen, Deena Jakoub and many more as well as Lindsey Stirling.

Discography

Within Temptation

My Indigo

Guest appearances 

 A Special edition later released.
 B Special appearance at the Pinkpop Festival.
 C Cover of the Within Temptation song, from The Silent Force.
 D Special rendition of the song for the 2009 Night of the Proms in the Netherlands.
 E Special appearance at the Metal Female Voices Fest.

Other songs

Videography

Within Temptation

Guest appearances 
 Time with Aemen (2003)
 In and Out of Love with Armin van Buuren (2008)
 We Are the Others with Delain (2012)
 Hier (with Ali B) (2014)
 Faded Out with Asking Alexandria (2022)

Filmography
 Karo wil goed dood (2023)

Awards

References

External links 

 Sharon den Adel on the website of Within Temptation
 Sharon den Adel on Discogs

1974 births
Living people
Dutch expatriates in Indonesia
Dutch expatriates in Hong Kong
Dutch fashion designers
Dutch women singer-songwriters
Dutch heavy metal singers
Dutch mezzo-sopranos
English-language singers from the Netherlands
Women heavy metal singers
People from Waddinxveen
Within Temptation members
20th-century Dutch women singers
21st-century Dutch women singers
21st-century Dutch singers
Dutch women fashion designers
Women in metal